Lumbo is a port on the northeast Indian Ocean coast of Mozambique. It is part of the Island of Mozambique District in Nampula Province.

It was served by a branch of the main northern line of the national Mozambique railway system which also serves the bigger port of Nacala to the north. It is also home to Lumbo Airport.

The Mozambique Island Bridge connects Lumbo with the Island of Mozambique.

References

Populated places in Nampula Province